Mukam is a village, and most sacred site of Mukam Mukti Dham temple of Bishnoi community, located on Bikaner-Jodhpur State Highway 20 about  from Nokha and   from Bikaner in Bikaner district in the Indian state of Rajasthan.

Mukam Mukti Dham
Bishnoi sect was founded by Guru Jambeshwar. He left his home after his parents death in 1483 and founded the Bishnoi community in 1485 at a sandy hill known as Samrathal. He preached the twenty nine (20+9) rules including protection of all living beings and green trees. Mukam Mukti Dham is a Bishnoi temple built over his samadhi.

See also
 Badopal, Haryana
 Bhakti movement
 Chipko movement
 Khejarli massacre
 Guru Jambheshwar University of Science and Technology
 Dayananda Saraswati
 Maqam (shrine)

References 

Cities and towns in Bikaner district
Hindu pilgrimage sites
Tourist attractions in Bikaner district
Tourist attractions in Bikaner
History of Bikaner
Hindu temples